Party of the Sun can refer to:

 Party of the Sun (Costa Rica)
 Party of the Sun (Uruguay)
 People's Party (Puerto Rico)